The Ikarus Orkan (Serbian Cyrillic: Икарус Оркан) was a three-seat twin-engined monoplane designed as a light bomber/reconnaissance aircraft in the Kingdom of Yugoslavia before World War II. It was designed and built at the Ikarus factory in Zemun-Belgrade.

Development
The Orkan was created as a private project by two young designers S. Momcilovic and D. Radojkovic. They tried to create a light two-engine bomber. By the end of 1937 most of the prototype documentation was complete. A wooden model was tested in early 1938 in the wind tunnel in Paris. The aircraft was high-winged with very clean aerodynamic fuselage and of full metal construction. The wing had a NACA 23012 airfoil with root thickness of 12% and the top sash thickness of 6%. The Yugoslav Air Force command was interested in the aircraft for the competition for the new Yugoslav twin engine medium bomber.

The prototype had to be shipped by June 14, 1939. Ikarus is committed to provide engines for aircraft and weapons. It was originally planned to use a 552 kW Hispano-Suiza 14AB because of its compactness. It was intended to be well-armed with a forward firing 20 mm Hispano Suiza HS.404 cannon and a rear-firing 20 mm Oerlikon FF for defence. It was also envisaged that the aircraft would have three 7.92 mm machine guns (two front and one on the back). From Orkana the expected performance was 500 km/h, rate of climb  in 4.5 minutes, the radius of action of 1,000 to 1,200 km, and 800 kg payload of bombs.

Electric equipment was the most recent available and was from the domestic manufacturers, Mikron and Teleoptik.  Teleoptik provided landing gear and flap control equipment which reported the position of the flaps and landing gear. More of them, Orkan had the internal crew communicator system, Teleoptik M-38 oxygen system, gun camera installation. Teleoptik also constructed the powered rear cannon mounting with electric firing.

French manufacturer Messier produced, to the Yugoslavian specification, the complete hydraulics equipment and landing gear. The system powered the landing gear, cooling gills, bomb bay door, and gunner sliding hood, tail wheel and flaps. Landing gear retracted into the nacelles behind the engines. The wheels were fitted with low pressure tires which allowed it to operate off grass airstrips.

While the prototype was being manufactured, the Second World War broke out, which caused additional problems. France banned the export of war materiel so in consultation with the YRAF command Hispano Suiza 14AB engine was replaced by 627 kW Fiat A.74 RC 38. This necessitated a change in the design of aircraft and estimate of the other parameters which led to a change in the completion of the prototype.

Operational history
The prototype was completed in April 1940, and the first flight was planned to be in the same month. However, due to the additional trimming, the maiden flight was made at Zemun airport on 24 June 1940. When landing, it was damaged and, due to the war in Europe, its repair took longer and it was not able to restart testings until March 1941. Flights began on 19 March 1941 and 13 flights were made by 5 April. The aircraft showed good results is to meet the expectations are set project task.  Serial production did not start because of the Invasion of Yugoslavia by Germany and Italy on 6 April.

During the brief war the Orkan was damaged and captured in September 1941. It was embarked on a train and transported to Nazi Germany for testing. The fate of the plane is unknown.

Operators

Yugoslav Royal Air Force

Specifications

See also
Rogožarski R-313
Zmaj R-1

References

Further reading

External links
http://vazduhoplovnetradicijesrbije.rs/index.php/istorija/223-ikarus-orkan
Ikarus Orkan
http://www.airwar.ru/enc/bww2/orkan.html (ru)

Ikarus aircraft
High-wing aircraft
Twin piston-engined tractor aircraft
Aircraft first flown in 1940
1940s Yugoslav bomber aircraft